Elidio De Paoli (born 26 August 1948 in Rezzato) is an Italian politician.

Biography
De Paoli was elected Senator for the first time in 1992, among the ranks of the Lombard Alpine League, and re-confirmed in the 1994 general election too. In 1996, he was a candidate with the League for Autonomy – Lombard Alliance, but he failed in his bid to be elected.

In the 1999 election, he was a candidate for the European Parliament for the Pensioners' Party. In 2001, he was elected to the Senate again and held office until 2006.

On the occasion of the 2006 general election, he signed a pact with The Union, a political coalition led by Romano Prodi. De Paoli failed to be elected to the Senate, but his party was decisive for the electoral victory of the coalition, so he was appointed Undersecretary for Sport in the second Prodi government.

References

1948 births
Living people
20th-century Italian politicians
21st-century Italian politicians
Members of the Italian Senate from Lombardy